Don't Trust the B---- in Apartment 23 is an American television sitcom created by Nahnatchka Khan. It was broadcast on ABC between April 11, 2012, and September 6, 2014, comprising two seasons and 26 episodes. Originally a mid-season replacement, the network renewed the series for a second season in May 2012; six episodes from the first season were aired as part of the second, without regard for continuity.

In the story, Krysten Ritter stars as Chloe, an irresponsible party girl who searches for roommates by asking for rent up front and then behaving outrageously until they leave. Her latest roommate, June Colburn (Dreama Walker), proves to be harder to drive away, and the women end up forming an unlikely friendship. The supporting cast includes James Van Der Beek, who portrays a fictionalized version of himself who is a friend of Chloe's.

Plot 
The series follows June Colburn as she moves from Indiana to New York City to pursue her dream job — until she finds out that it no longer exists. She ends up moving in with a bon vivant party girl named Chloe. Chloe keeps her apartment by inviting roommates to move in, asking for rent up front, and then behaving outrageously until they leave. June proves more difficult to dislodge than expected, and when June reverses Chloe's latest attempt to eject her in an unexpected fashion, they end up forming an unlikely friendship.

Cast and characters

Main 
 Krysten Ritter as Chloe, the titular "Bitch in Apartment 23", a hard-partying, irresponsible, freeloading, sexually adventurous con artist, described as having "the morals of a pirate"
 Dreama Walker as June Colburn, who becomes Chloe's roommate after moving to New York from Richmond, Indiana, and losing both her job and her apartment
 Liza Lapira as Robin (season 1; guest, season 2), a nurse and one of Chloe's former roommates, who is obsessed with her
 Michael Blaiklock as Eli Webber, a city health inspector and next-door neighbor of Chloe and Junes who occasionally spies on the girls
 Eric André as Mark Reynolds, the meek manager of a coffee shop who hires June, whom he met at her failed job, to work for him
 James Van Der Beek as a fictionalized version of himself, who is a close friend of Chloe's and desperate to revamp his dwindling acting career
 Ray Ford as Luther Wilson (season 2; recurring, season 1), James's personal assistant

Recurring 
 Tate Ellington as Steven, June's ex-fiancé
 Eve Gordon as Connie Colburn, June's mother, whom June, then James, occasionally turns to for advice
 Peter MacKenzie as Donald Colburn, June's father
 Katherine Tokarz as Nicole, a nurse with whom Steven cheats on June
 Jennie Pierson as Pepper, June and Mark's socially awkward coworker at the coffee shop
 Rosalind Chao as Pastor Jin, the pastor at the First Korean Baptist Church where June attends worship services
 Angelique Cabral as Fox Paris, June's rival at Harkin Financial
 Teresa Huang as Hillary, June's coworker at Harkin Financial

Guest 
 Michael Landes as Scott, Chloe's father, who has a brief relationship with June
 Marin Hinkle as Karen, Chloe's paraplegic mother
 Kerris Dorsey as Molly, Chloe's temporary foster daughter
 Nora Kirkpatrick as Crissy, June's friend
 Hartley Sawyer as Charles, who has a brief sexual relationship with June
 Shanti Lowry as Valentina, James's upgraded Dancing with the Stars partner
 David Krumholtz as Patrick Kelly, the creator of the graphic novel Shitagi Nashi (Tall Slut, No Panties), based on Chloe
 Ben Lawson as Benjamin Lovett, an Australian director, who is friends with James and becomes a love interest for Chloe
 Keith Allan as Peter, an employee at People magazine
 Missi Pyle as Angie Beckencort, a lousy pro dancer who ends up paired with James on Dancing with the Stars
 Fiona Gubelmann as Stephanie, one of June's friends from Pilates
 Kyle Howard as Daniel, who briefly dates June
 Patti Deutsch as an old lady
 Michael Stahl-David as Teddy, Chloe's childhood friend from psychopath camp
 Nicholas D'Agosto as Will, James's agent's assistant who briefly dates June
 Jonathan Willie Cruz as James Martinez, June's and Luther's yoga instructor
 Meg Chambers Steedle as Emily, who briefly dates James
 Sarah Wright Olsen as Trish, Chloe's first New York roommate
 Meagen Fay as Katherine, James's mother

Special cameos 

 Kiernan Shipka, James's co-star in a poorly conceived father/daughter body-swap film
 Kevin Sorbo, Chloe's unwitting wedding date
 Dean Cain, James's Dancing with the Stars rival
 Busy Philipps, James's former Dawson's Creek co-star
 Frankie Muniz, a hapless shopper
 Mark-Paul Gosselaar, who gives James a pep-talk about fleeting fame
 Karina Smirnoff, Dean Cain's Dancing with the Stars partner
 Charo, Chloe's muse
 Richard Dean Anderson, one of the potential candidates to be James's biological father

Episodes

Series overview

Season 1 (2012)

Season 2 (2012–14)

Production and release 

By January 2009, the project was being developed for Fox with the interim title You Can't Trust the Bitch in Apartment 23, but was not selected to the 2009 fall contender. A year later, ABC greenlit the production of a pilot episode. In May 2011, the network picked up the project to series under the shortened title Apartment 23. The same month, ABC confirmed the series would premiere as a mid-season replacement in the 2011–12 fall season. In October, ABC changed back the series name, this time to a bowdlerized version, censoring the word "Bitch" and replaced with "B----". Ahead of its television premiere, the series' first two episodes were released in the United States on iTunes, Hulu, Xfinity, and ABC's website, and in Canada on Rogers on Demand and Citytv's website.

On May 11, 2012, ABC renewed the series for a second season. On May 23, the first season ended its broadcast run; seven episodes were aired, although the initial order consisted of 13 episodes. Thus, six episodes were carried over into the following broadcast run, bringing the second season to 19 episodes. ABC elected to air the six remaining episodes out of order, interspersing first and second-season episodes without regard to continuity. As a result, some multi-episode plot arcs (particularly James's appearance on Dancing with the Stars and June's travails at a new job outside the coffee shop) are almost incomprehensibly jumbled in the original broadcast order. For the second season, Ray Ford was upgraded to the main cast, after having recurring appearances in the first season.

On January 22, 2013, ABC announced the series' immediate removal from its schedule. The following day, the cast confirmed the series' cancellation. In February, star Krysten Ritter stated that she believed the remaining eight unaired episodes would be broadcast in the following summer. In April, the network confirmed that the eight episodes would be released online on iTunes, Hulu and ABC's website between May 17 and June 2. On July, 2014, it was announced that Logo TV would broadcast the entire series in the correct order, including the eight unaired episodes, beginning July 19.

Reception

Critical response 
At the first ceremony of the Critics' Choice Television Award, on June 20, 2011, Don't Trust the B---- in Apartment 23 was included among eight of the Most Exciting New Series, voted by television journalists who watched its pilots.

On review aggregator Rotten Tomatoes, the first season has an approval rating of 88% based on 41 reviews, with an average rating of 6.8/10. The website's general consensus reads, "An odd couple sitcom with a modern twist, Don't Trust the B---- in Apartment 23 is sleeker and smarter than expected, thanks to strong acting and snappy dialogue." For the first season, Metacritic calculated an average of 71 out of 100 based on 29 reviews, indicating "generally favorable reviews".

The second season has an approval rating of 83% based on 12 reviews on Rotten Tomatoes, with an average rating of 7.3/10. The website's general consensus reads, "The unique pairing of Krysten Ritter and Dreama Walker continues to entertain in the second snarky season of Don't Trust the B----, which further hones its comedic voice and snide asides."

Due to popularity of the show after its cancellation, attempts to revive the show for another season have been petitioned by fans on petition sites.

Ratings

Awards and nominations

International broadcast

Notes

References

External links 

 

2010s American single-camera sitcoms
2012 American television series debuts
2013 American television series endings
American Broadcasting Company original programming
English-language television shows
Television series by 20th Century Fox Television
Television series created by Nahnatchka Khan
Television shows filmed in New York City
Television shows set in New York City